Pandori is a village in the Punjab state of India. It is located near to  the city of Sultanpur Lodhi in Kapurthala district.

About 
Pandori lies on the Sultanpur Lodhi-Phatu Dhinga road. The nearest railway station to Pandori is Sultanpur railway station at a distance of 8 km.

Post code 
Pandori's post code is 144401.

See also
Ratan Pandoravi

References 

Villages in Jalandhar district